The Rallye Côte d'Ivoire, perhaps better known as the Rallye Bandama as it was originally called, or the Ivory Coast Rally is a rally race held annually in Côte d'Ivoire in Africa. In common with other races on the continent, it is known for its arduous conditions and high attrition rate among competitors; the chances of finishing were 1 out of 10 and in 1972, 45 cars started, and no cars finished. It was part of the World Rally Championship for drivers and manufacturers from 1978 to 1981, and part of the drivers' championship only in 1977 and from 1982 to 1992. In 2006, the event was part of the African Rally Championship, but was dropped for the 2007 season due to reports by observers.

The 2010 event was cancelled due to the political situation in the country.

Winners

References

Rally competitions in Ivory Coast
Motorsport in Africa
Cote
Cote
Recurring sporting events established in 1969